The 1968 Australian Film Awards (known retroactively as the Australian Film Institute Awards) ceremony, presented by the Australian Film Institute (AFI), honoured the best feature and non-feature films of 1969, and took place on 2 December 1969 at National Library Theatre, in Canberra, Australian Capital Territory. Australian Prime Minister John Gorton hosted the ceremony. During the ceremony the Australian Film Institute presented two gold, nine silver and bronze prizes, four special awards and certificates for twelve honourable mentions.

Bullocky and The Die-Hard Legend of Lasseter's Lost Golden Reef both received gold prizes and Jack and Jill: A Postscript, which won a silver prize became the first feature film to ever win an award from the AFI.

When the Australian Film Institute established the Australian Academy of Cinema and Television Arts (AACTA) in 2011, the awards became known as the AACTA Awards.

Ceremony
The ceremony was held on 2 December 1969, at the National Library Theatre, located in Canberra, Australian Capital Territory. It was hosted by the 19th Prime Minister of Australia, John Gorton. During the Ceremony Gorton made a speech, praising the Australian Film Institute (AFI) for "[...] conveying the more refined aspects of Australian life and for projecting an image of the nation as something other than 'avant-garde kangaroos or Ned Kelly's'". One hundred and fifty-four films were submitted for competition and the winning films were judged by a jury composed of film critics, Colin Bennett and Lindsey Browne, and film director David Bairstow. Of the submitted films, the jury noted that there was a "[...] continuing advance in professional competence across the spectrum of the 154 entries[...]" and that "Grand Prix material remains illusive in the competition - but perhaps not for long. Australian film talent is obviously gathering momentum."

Winners
During the ceremony the Australian Film Institute handed out two Golden Reel awards, nine silver and bronze prizes and four special awards. Awards were given to films from eight categories which included documentaries, advertising, teaching, children's, public relations, experimental, travel and general. Recipients of the awards included Gil Brealey and Venture Films for their documentaries Bullocky and The Die-Hard Legend of Lasseter's Lost Golden Reef, which both received the Golden Reel prize. Silver prize winning film Jack and Jill: A Postscript was the first feature film to receive an award from the AFI, which went to Phillip Adams and Brian Robinson. It is also considered the first feature film to win in the Best Film category of the AACTA Awards. Special medallions were presented for technical achievements in optical effects, photography, editing and cinematography. Twelve films from the competition received a certificate of honourable mention.

Prizes

Special awards

Honourable mention

References

Further reading

Film
A
1969 in Australian cinema